Lieutenant Commander Arthur James Elliot II (April 9, 1933 – December 29, 1968) was an American naval officer killed during the Vietnam War. He received a Bachelor of Science Degree from the Gorham State Teachers College in Gorham, Maine, in 1955. In June 1956, he entered the Navy Officer Candidate School and was commissioned an Ensign in the Naval Reserve in October of that year. In 1962, Elliot was assigned as Aide and Flag Lieutenant to Commander, Naval Surface Forces, U.S. Pacific Fleet. Upon completion of this tour, he reported for duty as Operations Officer aboard (DDG-3). He was the son of Mr. and Mrs. Albert B. Elliot of Thomaston, Maine.

In December 1967, Elliot volunteered for duty in Vietnam, where he served as Commanding Officer of PBR Squadron 57, operating in the Mekong Delta. Under his command, his squadron of river boats achieved an outstanding combat record, taking part in several major riverine operations.  On December 29, 1968, Elliot was killed in action while leading his squadron in a riverine interdiction mission. He received the Bronze Star with Combat "V".

Elliot's awards include the Legion of Merit Medal, the Bronze Star with Combat "V", the Purple Heart, National Defense Service Medal, the Vietnam Service medal with two bronze stars, the Vietnam Gallantry Cross with palm, the National Order of Vietnam (5th Class), the Vietnam Campaign Ribbon, the Armed Forces Expeditionary Service Medal and the Navy Expedition Medal.

Honors
 was named in his honor and in commission from January 22, 1977, to December 2, 2003.

References 

1933 births
1968 deaths
United States Navy officers
Recipients of the Legion of Merit
People from Thomaston, Maine
Military personnel from Maine
University of Southern Maine alumni
United States Navy personnel of the Vietnam War
American military personnel killed in the Vietnam War